Henry Samuel Priest (February 7, 1853 – July 9, 1930) was a United States district judge of the United States District Court for the Eastern District of Missouri.

Education and career

Born in Ralls County, Missouri, Priest received an Artium Baccalaureus degree from Westminster College in 1872. He read law in 1873 and entered private practice in Moberly, Missouri. There he served as city attorney, and was an attorney for the Missouri Pacific Railroad and Wabash Railroad from 1881 to 1894.

Federal judicial service

On August 6, 1894, President Grover Cleveland nominated Priest to the United States District Court for the Eastern District of Missouri, to a seat vacated by Judge Amos Madden Thayer. He was confirmed by the United States Senate on August 9, 1894, and received his commission the same day. Priest served for less than a year, and then resigned on May 23, 1895.

Later career and death

Following his resignation from the federal bench, Priest resumed private practice in St. Louis, Missouri. He was a candidate for the United States Senate from Missouri in 1920, but did not win election. He ran an unsuccessful campaign for Governor of Missouri in 1924. He died in St. Louis on July 9, 1930.

References

Sources
 

1853 births
1930 deaths
Judges of the United States District Court for the Eastern District of Missouri
United States federal judges appointed by Grover Cleveland
19th-century American judges
Westminster College (Missouri) alumni
United States federal judges admitted to the practice of law by reading law
People from Ralls County, Missouri
People from Moberly, Missouri